The Show Girl is a 1927 American silent drama film directed by Charles J. Hunt and starring Mildred Harris, Gaston Glass and Mary Carr.

Cast
 Mildred Harris as Maizie Udell 
 Gaston Glass as Billy Barton 
 Mary Carr as Mrs. Udell 
 Robert McKim as Edward Hayden 
 Eddie Borden as 'Breezy' Ayres 
 William H. Strauss as Moe Kenner 
 Sam Sidman as Heinie 
 Aryel Darma as Alma Dakin

References

Bibliography
 Munden, Kenneth White. The American Film Institute Catalog of Motion Pictures Produced in the United States, Part 1. University of California Press, 1997.

External links
 

1927 films
1927 drama films
1920s English-language films
American silent feature films
Silent American drama films
American black-and-white films
Films directed by Charles J. Hunt
Rayart Pictures films
1920s American films